Denis Dynon VC (September 1822 – 16 February 1863) was an Irish recipient of the Victoria Cross, the highest and most prestigious award for gallantry in the face of the enemy that can be awarded to British and Commonwealth forces.

Details
Born in Kilmannon, Queen's County, he first enlisted in the 44th Regiment of Foot, transferring into the 53rd Regiment of Foot in 1844. He served in the Sutlej Campaign of 1845-46 (battles of Aliwal and Sobraon) and the Punjab Campaign of 1848–49.

Dynon was about 35 years old, and a sergeant in the (later The King's Shropshire Light Infantry), British Army during the Indian Mutiny when the following deed took place on 2 October 1857 at Ghota Behar, India for which he and Lieutenant John Charles Campbell Daunt were awarded the VC:

Further information
He was forced to leave the army due to ill health and was admitted to Kilmainham Hospital in Dublin. He died on 16 February 1863. His burial place is unknown. His VC is on display in the Lord Ashcroft Gallery at the Imperial War Museum, London.

References

Listed in order of publication year 
The Register of the Victoria Cross (1981, 1988 and 1997)

Ireland's VCs (Dept of Economic Development, 1995)
Monuments to Courage (David Harvey, 1999)
Irish Winners of the Victoria Cross (Richard Doherty & David Truesdale, 2000)

External links
Location of grave and VC medal (Dublin)
VC medal auction details

1822 births
1863 deaths
19th-century Irish people
Irish soldiers in the British Army
People from County Laois
King's Shropshire Light Infantry soldiers
Irish recipients of the Victoria Cross
Indian Rebellion of 1857 recipients of the Victoria Cross
British military personnel of the Second Anglo-Sikh War
British military personnel of the First Anglo-Sikh War
Essex Regiment soldiers
British Army recipients of the Victoria Cross
Military personnel from County Laois